is a Japanese former field hockey player who competed in the 2008 Summer Olympics.

References

External links
 
 

1984 births
Living people
Japanese female field hockey players
Asian Games medalists in field hockey
Asian Games gold medalists for Japan
Asian Games bronze medalists for Japan
Asian Games silver medalists for Japan
Field hockey players at the 2002 Asian Games
Field hockey players at the 2006 Asian Games
Field hockey players at the 2008 Summer Olympics
Field hockey players at the 2010 Asian Games
Field hockey players at the 2014 Asian Games
Field hockey players at the 2016 Summer Olympics
Field hockey players at the 2018 Asian Games
Medalists at the 2002 Asian Games
Medalists at the 2006 Asian Games
Medalists at the 2010 Asian Games
Medalists at the 2018 Asian Games
Olympic field hockey players of Japan
People from Toyama (city)